Elizabeth Talbot may refer to:

Elizabeth Grey, Countess of Kent, born Elizabeth Talbot (1582–1651)
Elizabeth de Mowbray, Duchess of Norfolk (née Talbot; c. 1443 – c. 1506)
Elizabeth Talbot, Baroness Lisle (d. 1487), daughter of John Talbot, 1st Viscount Lisle
Elizabeth Talbot, Countess of Shrewsbury, known as Bess of Hardwick (c. 1521–1608)
Elizabeth Ross Talbot Banner, aka Betty Talbot, a fictional character from Marvel Comics, wife of Bruce Banner, alter ego of Hulk
Liz Yelling (born 1974), British long-distance runner born Elizabeth Talbot